Christian De Sica (born 5 January 1951) is an Italian actor and film director.

Life 
De Sica was born in Rome the second son of Italian director Vittorio De Sica and Spanish actress María Mercader. His first cousin once removed was Ramón Mercader, the murderer of Leon Trotsky. After attending Liceo classico in Rome, where he had Carlo Verdone as his deskmate, De Sica worked in a hotel in Venezuela, where he began his career as an artist. He enrolled in Lettere (Literature and Arts) at La Sapienza university (1970) but did not graduate.

He was attracted to music, and participated in the Sanremo Festival singing "Mondo mio" ("My World") (1973). However, the results convinced him to follow in his father's footsteps and devote himself to acting. De Sica developed his own style of comedy and entertainment also in Rai television shows, such as Bambole, non c'è una lira, which gave him a large success in 1978.

Acting career 

With his father's help, he was able to take his first steps in the movie world with such teachers and mentors as Roberto Rossellini (Blaise Pascal, 1971), Vittorio De Sica himself (Una breve vacanza, 1973), Pupi Avati (Bordella, 1976) and Salvatore Samperi (1979 Liquirizia and 1981 Casta e pura).

He married Silvia Verdone, sister of Carlo, with whom he had two children, Brando and Mariarosa. He achieved fame in the 1980s: in 1982 Borotalco was released, together with his brother-in-law Verdone, then he filmed Sapore di Mare with Jerry Calà as well as Yuppies, Yuppies 2, Grandi Magazzini and Compagni di Scuola.

After Night club, the last film directed by Italian director Sergio Corbucci, Christian De Sica became one of the most famous interpreters of the "cine-panettone" (comedies that reach movie theatres during the Christmas season) and formed till 2005 a partnership with actor Massimo Boldi. They acted together in the series of Vacanze di Natale and A spasso nel tempo (1996), Paparazzi (1998), Tifosi (1999) and Christmas in Love (2004). By 2002, their films had grossed 300 billion lire ($150 million). Afterwards, he starred in Natale a New York (2006), Natale in crociera (2007) and Natale a Rio (2008). These films, done in burlesque style, tend to be well received at the box office, if not by critics, at times even outstripping better known and expensively made movies such as the Harry Potter series.

As an actor, De Sica has won three David di Donatello awards: a prize for Giovannino in 1976, a special one together with Massimo Boldi in 2000, and the third one in 2009.

He received the America Award of the Italy-USA Foundation in 2016.

Directing career 
Since 1990 Christian De Sica has also been a director: he debuted with Faccione, whose script he wrote and tailor-made for actress Nadia Rinaldi. After Count Max, a homage to the cinema of his father and of Mario Camerini, that he interpreted with Ornella Muti, Anita Ekberg and his mother Maria Mercader, De Sica went on self-directing in Ricky & Barabba (1992), Men Men Men (1995), Tre (1996), Simpatici & antipatici (1998) and The Clan (2005).

A great admirer of Frank Sinatra and above all of Marlon Brando, he named his first child Brando in honour of the American actor. Criticism has often likened his acting to that of Alberto Sordi, from whom De Sica has drawn a lot of his expressions.

Filmography

Films

Television

References

External links 
 
 

1951 births
20th-century Italian male actors
Italian male comedians
Italian film directors
Italian people of Spanish descent
20th-century Italian screenwriters
21st-century Italian screenwriters
Living people
Nastro d'Argento winners
David di Donatello Career Award winners
People of Lazian descent
21st-century Italian male actors
Italian male screenwriters